Julia Schlecht (born 16 March 1980) is a former German female volleyball player. She was part of the Germany women's national volleyball team.

She competed with the national team at the 2004 Summer Olympics in Athens, Greece. She played with TSV Bayer 04 Leverkusen in 2004.

Clubs
  TSV Bayer 04 Leverkusen (2004)

See also
 Germany at the 2004 Summer Olympics

References

External links

1980 births
Living people
German women's volleyball players
Place of birth missing (living people)
Volleyball players at the 2004 Summer Olympics
Olympic volleyball players of Germany